This is a list of finalists for the 1997 Archibald Prize for portraiture (listed is Artist – Title).

 Rick Amor – Peter Carey at the VACB Studio, Soho, New York
    Tom Carment – Roger McDonald at work
 Judy Cassab – Elwyn Lynn
    Peter Churcher – Portrait of John S. Levi, first Australian Born Rabbi
 Fred Cress – David Williamson
 Adam Cullen – Portrait of Mikey Robins (comedian)
    Elisabeth Cummings – Jean Appleton
    Merilyn Fairskye – Jackie 2
    Joe Furlonger – Self-portrait with model
 George Gittoes – John Olsen
 Robert Hannaford – Paul Davies (scientist)
    Nicholas Harding – Portrait of Kevin Connor
 Bill Leak – Tex (Perkins) (Winner: Packing Room Prize)
 Kerrie Lester – Janet Vernon in reflection
    Mathew Lynn – Jeanne Ryckmans (Winner: People's Choice) Highly Commended
 Jocelyn Maughan – Dr John Yu
    Lewis Miller – Portrait of Allan Mitelman II
    Henry Mulholland – Dr Peter Elliott
    Paul Newton – Kate and Barbie (A portrait of Kate Fischer)
 Rodney Pople – (Galbraith)
 Jenny Sages – Greg Weight making a portrait of Tom Bass
 Timothy Schultz – Odalisque – portrait of Wendy Sharpe
 Martin Sharp – Tiny Tim, Eternal Troubadour
 Garry Shead – Carpe(t) Diem – Adam Rish
 Jiawei Shen – Seven self-portraits (Highly commended) (Image)
 Kim Spooner – (Barrie Kosky) Expecting each moment to be his next
 Nigel Thomson – Barbara Blackman (Winner: Archibald Prize 1997) (Image)
 Imants Tillers – Portrait of a Chancellor (U.T.S)
    Greg Warburton – Genni Batterham OAM
    Dick Watkins – Des O'Brien
    Salvatore Zofrea – Summer of the Seventeenth Doll Opera

See also
Previous year: List of Archibald Prize 1996 finalists
Next year: List of Archibald Prize 1998 finalists
List of Archibald Prize winners

External links
Archibald Prize 1997 finalists official website

1997
Archibald Prize 1997
Archibald Prize 1997
Archibald
Arch